WCVA may refer to:

 WCVA (AM), a radio station (1490 AM) licensed to Culpeper, Virginia, United States
 Wales Council for Voluntary Action
 Washington County Visitors Association, a destination marketing organization located in Oregon